Kabir Stori (6 April 1942 – 4 April 2006) was a Pashtun nationalist, poet, and writer from Kunar Province of Afghanistan. He was chairman of the Pashtoons Social Democratic Party, a political party that he founded, until his death.

Early life
Stori was born on 6 April 1942 in Khas Kunar, a village in Kunar Province of Afghanistan. Stori was Mirdadkhel, from the Yousafzai tribe. His primary education was from a government elementary school in Khas Kunar; later he joined the Rahman Baba Lycee in Kabul to further his education. He was selected by the Afghan government due to very good school performance to study in Germany. Kabir studied psychology with political science, sociology, and philosophy from the universities of Frankfurt, Cologne, and Marburg, attaining a doctorate in natural sciences (Diplom Psychologist, Dr. rer. nat.).

Political activities
In 1966 Stori founded the Afghan Students Association in Frankfurt, serving as its chairman. He also served as chairman of the General Union of Afghan Students in 1972 and the National Liberation Union of Pashtuns and Balochs in Frankfurt in 1976. He worked for the Deutsche Welle in 1973 as an announcer/editor and helped to build the Pashto Service. He founded the Pashtoons Social Democratic Party (PSDP) in February 1981 in Germany and was the first elected chairman. 

Kabir Stori refused several offers from Mohammad Najibullah and Hamid Karzai to join the Afghan government but denied both on political grounds.

He also served on the editorial boards of various magazines including: 
Sparghai (1972) (monthly) published by the 'General Union of Afghan Students',
Olas Ghag (1976) published by the 'National Liberation Union of Pashtoons and Baluchs',
Peer Rokhan (1978) (monthly),
Lamba (1985) (monthly),
De Khyber Wagma (1986) (monthly) published in Germany and
Pashtoonkhwa (1978) published by Social Democratic Party - Germany.

He played a pivotal role in  
De Pakhtano Kulturi Tolana - Germany (Pashtoon Cultural Association) in 1985,
Pakhtoon Kor - Germany (1993) and
the Pakhtoonkhwa Pohanay Dera (1998) (The Pashtoonkhwa Home of Science) in Peshawar and in the year 2003 the Pakhto Adabi Hunari Tolana in Kunar.

Prison stay 
Afghan national Kabir Stori was arrested on 16. January 1983 in Pakistan while visiting his family in Peshawar. The reason for his arrest was to endanger the security of Pakistan, caused by his idea to create a united Pashtunistan. Amnesty International received reports that he had been tortured. Stori spent one and a half years in various Peshawar prisons because of his nationalist ideals for Afghans. Leading political and diplomatic circles in the Federal Republic of Germany learned of his fate through Voice of Germany. The RFFU took steps to secure his release. Hermann Schreiber, the magazine's editor, published in GEO (magazine) on 11 August 1983 a report on Stori's case.

Literary works

Stori’s poems are mostly about patriotism.  His poem collections include 

Skarwatta (Embers): An Anthology of Poems,(1976, published together with another Afghan Poet, Germany)
Jwandi Khyaloona (Alive Thoughts), (1997, Designed and printed by KOR, Publications Department, Peshawar Pakistan)
De Qalam Tora (Sword of the Pen), (1999, Designed and printed by Danish Culture Association; Publisher: The Pakhtoonkhwa Home of Science, Peshawar/Pakistan)
Sandareez Paigham (Message by the songs), (2002, Designed and printed by Danish Culture Association; Publisher: The Pakhtoonkhwa Home of Science, Peshawar/Pakistan)
Khwagi Misrai (Sweetest Verses), (2006, Designed and printed by Danish Culture Association; Publisher: The Pakhtoonkhwa Home of Science, Peshawar/Pakistan)
Kulyaat, (2007, Designed and printed by Danish Culture Association; Publisher: The Pakhtoonkhwa Home of Science, Peshawar/Pakistan)

Stori's poetry 
Stori wrote a collection of poetry's in his native Pashto language. 

The most famous verse he wrote was about his love for Pashto and how proud he was to be Pashtun:Sa me wakhla kho Pashto rana wa nakhle

Take my breath but don't take my Pashto

Sa Pashtun yem pa Pakhto bande Patman yem

I'm Pashtun, respected by Pashto

Ka sama Stori pa kaber chera rashe

If you come to Stori's grave

Pa Pashto rata dawa wakra par mayen yem

Pray for me in Pashto because I'm in love with itThis Pashtun nationalism demonstrates his love and passion for his nation, culture, and language.

Research works
His psychological works include 

Wira (Fear): theories, measurement and therapy of fear, (1985,1990 Germany; 2001, Peshawar Pakistan, printed by KOR, Publications Department; Publisher: The Pakhtoonkhwa Home of Science, Peshawar/Pakistan)
De Wire Tala (Psychology), (1992, Germany)
De Hukhyartia Tala (Intelligence-Test), (2000, Designed and printed by KOR, Publications Department; Publisher: The Pakhtoonkhwa Home of Science, Peshawar/Pakistan)
Zabsapohana (Language Psychology), (2000, Designed and printed by Danish Culture Association; Publisher: The Pakhtoonkhwa Home of Science, Peshawar/Pakistan)
De Hokhyartia Kulturi be Palawa Tala (Kulturfairer Intelligenz-Test (C-I- T)) in three languages (Pashtu, English and German), (2004, Designed and printed by KOR, Publications Department; Publisher: The Pakhtoonkhwa Home of Science, Peshawar/Pakistan)
De Pedaikhti Banno De Hokhyartia Tala (Naturformen des Intelligenztests (N-I-T), in three languages (Pashtu, English and German), (2004, Designed and printed by KOR, Publications Department; Publisher: The Pakhtoonkhwa Home of Science, Peshawar/Pakistan)

Death and tributes 

Stori suffered a heart attack and died on 4 April 2006 at 05:32 AM in Wesseling, Germany. He was buried in his native graveyard in Khas Kunar, Afghanistan.

On the 7th anniversary of his death, the school in his hometown was renamed from "Khas Kunar Lycee" to "Dr. Kabir Stori Lycee" by the government from Afghanistan.

See also
Pashto literature and poetry
Pashtun nationalism
Khas Kunar District
Afzal Khan Lala

References

External links

KabirStori.com (Official Website of Kabir Stori)
Pashtoonkhwa.com (Stori was Founder and Leader of Pashtoons Social Democratic Party)

1942 births
2006 deaths
Pashtun people
Pashtun nationalists
Pashto-language poets
20th-century Afghan poets
People from Kunar Province
Afghan expatriates in Pakistan
Afghan emigrants to Germany